Magomedsalam Magomedaliyevich Magomedov (born June 1, 1964) is a Russian politician who served as the 3rd Head of the Republic of Dagestan, a federal subject of the Russian Federation found in the North Caucasus region, from 2010 to 2013. His appointment by the President of Russia Dmitry Medvedev was approved by the parliament of Dagestan on February 10, 2010. Magomedov is an ethnic Dargin. His father, Magomedali Magomedov, served as President of Dagestan between 1987 and 2006. It is his stated ambition as president to consolidate and modernise the republic to counter the threat of Islamic extremism, in particular the attempts made to undermine and terrorise the republic by supporters of the so-called Caucasus Emirate. His resignation was accepted by President Vladimir Putin on January 28, 2013. After that he was appointed Deputy Head of the Administration of the President of the Russian Federation.

Magomedsalam Magomedov has an academic background and differs from his predecessors who were Soviet-era Communist Party leaders who adapted to changed circumstances. Prior to the presidency, Magomedsalam Magomedov was elected speaker of Dagestan’s parliament in 2006 for a period of one year.

He speaks Dargin, Russian, and English.

In 2001-2002, Magomedov was vice president of FC Anzhi.

In 2010, Magomedov made the fifth pillar of Islam, the hajj, and met with Deputy Prime Minister and Minister of Interior of the Kingdom of Saudi Arabia Prince Nayef bin Abdulaziz at the residence of Abdullah of Saudi Arabia.

References

1964 births
Living people
1st class Active State Councillors of the Russian Federation
Dargwa people
Heads of the Republic of Dagestan
People from Dagestan
United Russia politicians
21st-century Russian politicians
Russian Sunni Muslims